Zhongpu Township or Jhongpu Township is a rural township in Chiayi County, Taiwan.

Geography

Administrative divisions
The township comprises 22 villages: Dingpu, Fushou, Hemei, Hemu, Hexing, Jinlan, Longmen, Longxing, Ruifeng, Sanceng, Shekou, Shenkeng, Shinong, Tongren, Tungxing, Wantan, Yanguan, Yiren, Yumin, Yunshui, Zhonglun and Zhongpu.

Economy
The agriculture sector of the township is one of Chiayi's most important fruit producers, such as growing papayas, pineapples, bananas, tangerines and mushrooms. 7,000 hectares of the township area is cultivated for agricultural purpose, in which the industry employs around 15,000 people, or 32% of the township population.

Tourist attractions
 Wu Feng Park

References

External links

 Jhongpu Township Office

Townships in Chiayi County